Jaff (also Jahf, Jaaf, Jaf, Caf) is the largest Kurdish tribe also known as clan, living in the borderlands of Iran and Iraq. Their heartland is between Sulaymaniyah to Sanandaj. The tribe predominantly adheres to the Shafi'i school with many Naqshbandi and Qadiriyya followers. It originated in the year 1114 by Zaher Beg Jaff, other important leaders were Mohamed Pasha Jaff, Lady Adela, Osman Pasha Jaff and Mahmud Pasha Jaff, their ancestral home is Sherwana Castle. The Ottoman Empire bestowed on them the name Pasha, a noble title, in the 1700s. They are the biggest Kurdish tribe in the Middle East with approximately 4 million people and they speak Babani Sorani. They ruled the Ardalan Principality until the 1860s.

Geographic distribution 
The Jaff tribe lives in the following cities and towns: Helebce, Kelar, Silêmanî, Ravansar, Sine, Ciwanrro, Selas-bawecanî, Kirmaşan, Xaneqîn.

History 

The West began ties with the Jaff tribe during World War I, when Ely Bannister Soane established contact. After the war, the tribe opposed Sheikh Mahmud Barzanji, as well as Great Britain's failure to grant Kurdish autonomy in Iraq. At the beginning of the 20th century, the tribe controlled one ninth of Iraq and controlled the communication system of the country. In 1933, about 100,000 rifles were in the hands of the tribe, contrary to the only 15,000 by the newly-established Iraq. During this period, the tribe sedentarized.

Notable members 

Leaders and politicians
Mohamed Pasha Jaff, a Kurdish king and supreme chief of the Jaff tribe, he built Sherwana Castle in 1734.
Osman Pasha Jaff, (born 1846) a Kurdish king, leader of the Jaff tribe, and married to Adela Khanum of the old Ardalan tribe.
Adela Jaff (1847–1924), called Princess of the Brave by the British; married Kurdish King Osman Pasha Jaff, was famous for her role in the region, namely in the era of Shiekh Mahmood Al-Jaff Hafeed.
Ahmed Mukhtar Jaff (1898–1934), was a member of Iraqi parliament and mayor of Halabja.
Nawzad Dawood Beg Jaff (also known as Nozad Dawood Fattah Al Jaff), Chairman of North Bank Iraq and leader of the Jaff tribe.
Akram Hamid Begzadeh Jaff, a Kurdish leader, politician, and former Minister Of Agriculture in Iraq.
Hanna Jaff (born 1986), American born Mexican-Kurd who is a politician, philanthropist, author, and spokeswoman.

Artists, poets, singer
Khanai Qobadi Jaff (ca.1700–1759), an 18th-century Jaff poet.
Nali Jaff (1797 or 1800–1855 or 1856), poet who contributed to making Sorani literary language of southern Kurdistan.
Abdulla Goran Jaff (1904–1962).
Tara Jaff (born 1958), singer and musician specializing in harp.
Scholars and academics
 Fereidoun Biglari (born 1970), archaeologist and museum curator.

References 

Kurdish tribes